The Ehle House Site is an archaeological site located at Nelliston in Montgomery County, New York.  The house that stood at this site was built in 1729 by Jacobus Ehle, a Palatine German, who preached in the Hudson Valley and then made his way to the Mohawk Valley. The house is no longer standing.

The site was listed on the National Register of Historic Places in 1982.

References

External links

Archaeological sites on the National Register of Historic Places in New York (state)
Historic American Buildings Survey in New York (state)
Houses completed in 1729
Geography of Montgomery County, New York
Palatine German settlement in New York (state)
National Register of Historic Places in Montgomery County, New York
1729 establishments in the Thirteen Colonies